A limit situation is any of certain situations in which a human being is said to have differing experiences from those arising from ordinary situations.

The concept was developed by Karl Jaspers, who considered fright, guilt, finality and suffering as some of the key limit situations arising in everyday life.

Encounters
James G. Hart described that encounters with limit situations unsettle individuals, break them out of their inauthentic identifications, remove them from the social bond, and force them to come alive and find new ways of communicating.  They can be compared to the similarly generative experience of the sense of bewilderment in Zen.  Hans-Georg Gadamer considered the limit situation to provide a revelatory encounter with the other; while facing the anxiety arising from the foreknowledge of death can equally prove a growth opportunity arising from a limit situation.

Psychoanalytic frame
Psychoanalysis can be seen as a structured limit situation, the psychoanalytic framework in particular providing an experience of finality and limits that can empower growth.

Third world politics
In his book Pedagogy of the Oppressed, Paulo Freire adapted the existential notion of limit situations to the Third World, seeing the constraints of underdevelopment as a limit situation on humanity, but also as a possible frontier point for increasing (in overcoming) one's human stature.

See also

References

Bibliography
 Richardson A. & Bowden J. (1993) The Westminster Dictionary of Christian Theology London; Westminster John Knox Press
Existentialism
Ontology
20th-century philosophy
Continental philosophy